Sultan Han is a large 13th-century Seljuk caravanserai located in the town of Sultanhanı, Aksaray Province, Turkey.

History
This fortified structure was built in 1229 (dated by inscription), during the reign of the Seljuk sultan Kayqubad I (r. 1220-1237), by the Syrian architect Muhammad ibn Khalwan al-Dimashqi (Dimashqi meaning from Damascus) along the Uzun Yolu (lit. long road) trade route leading from Konya to Aksaray and continuing into Persia. After it was partially destroyed by a fire, it was restored and extended in 1278 by the governor Seraceddin Ahmed Kerimeddin bin El Hasan during the reign of the sultan Kaykhusraw III.

Description
The caravanserai is considered one of the best examples of Seljuk architecture in Turkey. Covering an area of 4,900 square meters, it is the largest medieval caravanserai in Turkey.

The khan is entered at the east, through a pishtaq, a 13-m-high gate made from marble, which projects from the front wall (itself 50 m wide). The pointed arch enclosing the gate is decorated with muqarnas corbels and a geometrically patterned plaiting. This main gate leads into a 44 x 58 m open courtyard that was used in the summer. A similarly decorated archway on the far side of the open courtyard, with a muqarnas niche, joggled voussoirs and interlocking geometric designs, leads to a covered courtyard (iwan), which was for winter use. The central aisle of the covered hall has a barrel-vaulted ceiling with transverse ribs, with a short dome-capped tower over the center of the vault. The dome has an oculus to provide air and light to the hall.

A square stone kiosk-mosque (köşk mescidi), the oldest example in Turkey, is located in the middle of the open courtyard. A construction of four carved barrel-vaulted arches supports the mosque on the second floor. The small prayer hall of the mosque contains a richly decorated mehrab (Qibla direction marker), and is lit by two windows. Stables with accommodation above were located in the arcades on both sides of the inner courtyard.

Gallery

See also
 Seljuk architecture
 List of Seljuk hans and kervansarays in Turkey

References

External links

 Sultan Han Aksaray

Buildings and structures completed in the 13th century
Buildings and structures in Aksaray Province
Buildings and structures of the Sultanate of Rum
Caravanserais in Turkey
History of Aksaray Province
Seljuk architecture